Provincial Road 459 (PR 459) is a very short provincial road in the southwest part of the Canadian province of Manitoba.

Route description 
Provincial Road 459, known as Grand Valley Road, is an east-west route and runs from the Trans-Canada Highway near the Grand Valley Provincial Campground to its terminus at PTH 10 (18th Street North) in Brandon.

PR 459 serves as a feeder route for communities located on the north end of Brandon from the Trans-Canada Highway as well as to the Brandon Experimental Station. The road travels in very close proximity to the Assiniboine River for most of its length, and offers a very scenic alternative route for people travelling in to Brandon as compared to the Trans-Canada Highway or PTH 1A.

Due to its close proximity to the Assiniboine River, a portion of the road was closed when the river overflowed its banks in the spring of 2011. Since then, PR 459 has been subject to spring closures to prevent future flooding incidents.

PR 459 is a paved road for its entire length.

References

External links 
Manitoba Official Map
Official Highway Map of Manitoba - Brandon

459